John Hulme (born 1969) is an American children's writer and film director, co-author of The Seems fantasy book series  with Michael Wexler. Books in this series are held in over 800 libraries, according to WorldCat.

He and Wexler edited an anthology of short stories, Voices of the Xiled, and created a National Public Radio radio series, "Vanishing Point", and Baked Potatoes: a Pot Smoker's Guide to Film and Video.

A native of Highland Park, New Jersey, Hulme directed the 2017 documentary film Blood, Sweat & Tears: A Basketball Exorcism, which covers the story of the 1987 championship basketball game between Hulme's Highland Park High School and their rivals at New Brunswick High School.

He also directed a documentary film, Unknown Soldier: Searching For A Father, about his father, who was killed in the Vietnam War and never met his son.

References

External links
About the Creators at The Seems (theseems.com) 
 
 

1969 births
American children's writers
Living people
Place of birth missing (living people)
People from Highland Park, New Jersey
Film directors from New Jersey
Highland Park High School (New Jersey) alumni